The Swedish Flower Hen, is an endangered traditional Swedish breed of domestic chicken. It is one of eleven traditional chicken breeds in Sweden.

History 

The Blommehöna is a traditional farmyard breed of chicken from southern Sweden; the Swedish name indicates that it comes from the landskap of Skåne. In 2022 the conservation status of the breed was listed as 'at risk/endangered'.

Fifteen birds were exported to the United States in 2010.

Characteristics 

The Blommehöna is characterised by its millefleur plumage pattern. The base colour is variable, and may be black, blue, buff or red.

References 

Chicken breeds
Chicken breeds originating in Sweden